The Hutchinson Glacier is a large active glacier on the east coast of the Greenland ice sheet.

This glacier was named after American aviator George R. Hutchinson who crash-landed and was stranded in the area in 1932 during an attempted around-the-world flight with his family and was rescued and brought to Ammasalik by a fishing trawler.

Geography

The terminus of the glacier is in the southern side of the mouth of the Kangerlussuaq Fjord, the second largest fjord in East Greenland.

This glacier is located in the Sermersooq municipality.

See also
List of glaciers in Greenland
List of fjords of Greenland

References

External links
 Science Flight Report- Operation IceBridge Arctic 2010
 The Cryosphere; The first complete inventory of the local glaciers
Glaciers of Greenland